Daniel Frank Errol Freitas (23 February 1901 – 10 April 1968) was a New Zealand rugby union player. A loose forward, Freitas represented West Coast at a provincial level, and was a member of the New Zealand national side, the All Blacks, in 1928. He played four games for the All Blacks but no test matches. He died in the Wahine disaster in 1968.

References

1901 births
1968 deaths
People from Hokitika
New Zealand rugby union players
New Zealand international rugby union players
West Coast rugby union players
Rugby union flankers
Deaths due to shipwreck at sea